French Affair was a German dance-pop band established in 1999. It has found highest popularity in German-speaking countries. They scored a number of hits in Europe between 2000 and 2003, including "My Heart Goes Boom (La Di Da Da)", "Do What You Like", "Sexy", and "Comme ci comme ça".

History 
The band's lead singer, Barbara Alcindor, was born in Paris, and has worked as a fashion model in London. She met the "Dreyer Brothers" production team and signed a contract with the BMG, a German record label, before scoring the chart with the hit "My Heart Goes Boom (La Di Da Da)" in early 2000. The single was a major hit in Europe, peaking within top 5 in many countries. It was followed by "Do What You Like", which also was a successful hit, and a debut album, Desire.

2001 saw the release of a new track: "Sexy", which also became a considerable hit. The following year the band released "I Like That", followed by another big hit: "Comme ci comme ça", released in 2003. In 2006, French Affair released their second, all-French album, Rendezvous, promoted by a single "Symphonie d'amour". The album featured vocals by Aimee, the band's new vocalist. 2008 saw the release of Belle Epoque, their last album to date.

In 2009 the group announced its dissolution.

Members
 Karsten Dreyer
 Thorsten Dreyer
 Barbara Alcindor
 Aimee

Discography

Albums

Singles

 2008: Ring Ding Dong
 2008: Into The Groove
 2009: My Heart Goes Boom (Reloaded)
 2009: Do What You Like (Reloaded)
 2010: My Heart Goes Boom (The US Remixes)
 2022: Sexy Remixes 
 2022: You Most Be Important

References

External links
French Affair at Allmusic
French Affair at Discogs
French Affair at Rate Your Music

French dance music groups
French pop music groups
German dance music groups
German pop music groups
Musical groups established in 1999
1999 establishments in France
1999 establishments in Germany